Arboretum Mustila is an arboretum near Elimäki in southern Finland.

The arboretum was founded in 1902 and is today maintained by a trust. At its inception it was intended as a testing ground for foreign species of conifers. Today it contains slightly less than 100 species of conifers and over 200 species of broad-leaved tree, in addition to other plants. Several of the trees are arranged in larger constellations rather than as individual specimen. Arboretum Mustila's collection of rhododendrons and azaleas is furthermore notable. The many species of trees occasionally attract locally rare birds, e.g. spotted nutcracker and two-barred crossbill. The arboretum is open to visitors for a fee and contains several walkways.

References

Arboreta in Finland
1902 establishments in Finland
Geography of Kymenlaakso
Tourist attractions in Kymenlaakso